Quigley's Point is a village in County Donegal, Ireland. Located on the eastern shores of Inishowen and overlooking Lough Foyle, the village is sometimes known locally as "Carrowkeel" (or "Carowkeel") as it is in a townland of that name. To the south is the city of Derry and to the north lie the villages of Moville and Greencastle. A car ferry links Greencastle with Magilligan during the summer.  The river Cabry, which flows through the area, is spanned by a late-18th century bridge at Quigley's Point.

Evidence of ancient settlement in the area includes a standing stone site in Cabry townland, and a reputed former cromlech site (since removed) in Carrowkeel townland.

The Presbyterian Church in Ireland has a church at Greenbank near the village. Greenbank Presbyterian Church was built in 1862 in a "Gothic influenced" style. The nearby Presbyterian church hall, which was gutted by fire following an apparent arson attack in 2003, was subsequently restored.

Quigley's Point had a population of 199 people at the time of the 2016 census, down from 227 in the 2011 census.

See also
 Isle of Doagh
 List of towns and villages in Ireland
 U.S. Naval Air Station Lough Foyle Ireland

References

Towns and villages in County Donegal